Farhang Holakouee-Naeinee (born 31 August 1944) is a culturally Iranian-American psychologist, sociologist, economist and radio personality. His radio program—hosted in the past by 670 KIRN and currently by Radio Hamrah—offers relationship advice to callers in Persian. Dr. Holakouee was born in Shiraz, Iran and currently resides in Los Angeles, California.

Education 
Holakouee has master's degrees in psychology, economics, and family counseling. He taught at the University of Tehran, before moving to the United States, where he completed a PhD in sociology at the University of Utah in 1974. During the Iranian revolution, he was dismissed from his position in University of Tehran for being member of The Bahá'í Faith.

Works 
Dr. Holakouee has written books and journal articles. Many of his lectures on family counseling and psychology are available on tape or online.

Although he doesn't have a Ph.D. in psychology, he often engages in telephone psychotherapy of patients via a live program where people refer to him as "Dr. Holakouee" when asking for psychological assessments and/or advice.

References

External links
 Holakouee Archive (Dr. Holakouee's radio show in Persian)

1944 births
Living people
Iranian sociologists
Iranian emigrants to the United States
Iranian Bahá'ís